Arthur Joseph Richardson (15 January 1913 – 1993) was an English professional footballer who played as a centre forward. After playing for Rochdale A.F.C as a wartime guest player he later joined the British Army during World War 2, in which he was wounded, being shot in the arm.

Arthur married Eileen Kelly in October 1939 in Chesterfield and later had 2 children.

References

External links

 https://www.cfchistory.com/

1913 births
1993 deaths
Footballers from Wigan
English footballers
Association football forwards
Burnley F.C. players
Chesterfield F.C. players
Rochdale A.F.C. wartime guest players
English Football League players